The Tecumseh State Correctional Institution (TSCI) is a  medium / maximum security state correctional institution for the Nebraska Department of Correctional Services. 

The TSCI is in Nemaha Township, Johnson County, about two miles north of Tecumseh, Nebraska, it was established in 1997. Construction began in 1998, and the TSCI began accepting inmates in December 2001. All inmates at TSCI are males who were adjudicated as adults and classified as medium or maximum custody. The institution is designed to house 960 inmates; it is the only facility in Nebraska to house death row inmates (except inmates who are within a week of their execution, who are housed at Nebraska State Penitentiary). 

Security Levels:  Maximum, Medium, Death Row
Average Population:  900
Number of Staff:  432
Cost Per Inmate Per Year:  $33,377

In 2013 it was over capacity, with 1,008 prisoners. A prisoner riot occurred in 2015.

A riot on May 10, 2015 resulted in the deaths of two inmates and injuries to two guards.

Another incident occurred on March 2, 2017, resulting in the deaths of two inmates.

References

External links
Tecumseh State Correctional Institution official website

Prisons in Nebraska
Buildings and structures in Johnson County, Nebraska

Execution sites in the United States
2001 establishments in Nebraska